Flesh (alternative title: Andy Warhol's Flesh) is a 1968 American film directed by Paul Morrissey and starring Joe Dallesandro as a hustler working on the streets of New York City. It highlights various Warhol superstars, in addition to being the film debuts of both Jackie Curtis and Candy Darling. Also appearing are Geraldine Smith as Joe's wife and Patti D'Arbanville as her lover.

Flesh was first shown at the Andy Warhol Garrick Theatre at 152 Bleecker Street in Manhattan on September 26, 1968. In January 1970, the film premiered at the Open Space Theatre in London, but due to controversy surrounding the film's censorship, it was pulled from the theater and wasn't publicly shown until 1971.

Flesh is the first film of the "Paul Morrissey Trilogy" produced by Andy Warhol. The other films in the trilogy include Trash (1970) and Heat (1972). All three have gained a cult following and are noted examples of the ideals and ideology of the time period.

Plot
As the film begins, Geri ejects Joe from their bed and insists he go out on the streets to make some money for her girlfriend's abortion. This leads to Joe's various encounters with clients, including an artist who wishes to draw Joe, played by Maurice Braddell, Louis Waldon as a gymnast, and John Christian.

Scenes filmed on the streets of New York City show Joe spending time with other hustlers, one of whom is played by his real life brother, and teaching the tricks of the trade to the new hustler, played by Barry Brown. The film includes a scene of Joe interacting with his real life one-year-old son. Flesh concludes with Joe in bed with Geraldine Smith and Patti D'Arbanville. The women strip Joe and begin to get intimate with each other. In turn, Joe gets bored and falls asleep.

Cast
 Joe Dallesandro as Joe, The Hustler
 Geraldine Smith as Geri 
 Maurice Braddell as The Artist
 Louis Waldon as David
 Geri Miller as Terry
 Candy Darling as Candy
 Jackie Curtis as Jackie
 Patti D'Arbanville as Geri's Girlfriend
 Barry Brown as Hustler

Production
Warhol and Morrissey conceived Flesh while Warhol was convalescing following the attempt on his life by Valerie Solanas. John Schlesinger was filming Midnight Cowboy, which featured several members of Warhol's entourage, including Viva and Ultra Violet who, with Morrissey, shot a separate short film during shooting of Midnight Cowboy's elaborate party scene.

Warhol initially endorsed the participation of his people but grew resentful at what he perceived as Schlesinger's poaching of Warhol's scene. Warhol decided to undercut Schlesinger by filming his own story about a male prostitute.

The film was photographed by Morrissey, using a 16mm Auricon camera favored by Warhol for his earlier films. This camera permitted the recording of sound directly onto the film and had a maximum run time of 33 minutes. This allowed for long improvised scenes. Morrissey often included the camera's flash frames and pops, which occur when starting and stopping the camera, as an aesthetic choice.

UK censorship controversy 
Flesh premiered in London at the Open Space Theatre on Tottenham Court Road on January 15, 1970. British censor John Trevelyan was wary of issuing the film a cinema certificate but had suggested it to distributor Jimmy Vaughan for club screenings. On February 3, 1970, following a complaint by a member of the public, authorities raided the Open Space Theatre because the film did not possess a British Board of Film Classification (BBFC) certificate. After a public protest, the BBFC passed Flesh with an uncut 'X' certificate on October 27, 1970. The film re-opened at the Chelsea Essoldo in 1971.

Reception
Flesh was originally not well received in the US and the UK, but it garnered popularity in Germany–being among the top 5 grossing movies of 1970. Over the years, the film has gained a cult following. Flesh ranks 478th on Empire magazine's 2008 list of the 500 greatest movies of all time, and in 2007, The Guardian picked Flesh as one of its "1000 Movies to See Before You Die". It holds an approval rating of 63% on Rotten Tomatoes based on 8 reviews, with an average rating of 7/10.

See also
 List of American films of 1968

References

Further reading
 Hofler, Robert (2014). Sexplosion: From Andy Warhol to A Clockwork Orange - How a Generation of Pop Rebels Broke All the Taboos. New York: itbooks, an imprint of HarperCollins Publishers. .

External links
 
 
 
 

1968 films
1968 LGBT-related films
American LGBT-related films
Bisexuality-related films
Lesbian-related films
Films about male prostitution in the United States
Films directed by Paul Morrissey
Transgender-related films
1960s English-language films
1960s American films